Rehovë may refer to the following places in Albania:

Rehovë, Poliçan, a village in the municipality of Poliçan, Berat County
Rehovë, Skrapar, a village in the municipality of Skrapar, Berat County
Rehovë, Kolonjë, a village in the municipality of Kolonjë, Korçë County
Rehovë, Korçë, a village in the municipality of Korçë, Korçë County